The Big Sea (1940) is an autobiographical work by Langston Hughes. In it, he tells his experience of being a writer of color in Paris, France, and his experiences living in New York, where he faced injustices surrounding systematic racism. In his time in Paris, Hughes struggled to find a stable income and had to learn to be efficient by taking many odd jobs like working in nightclubs and small writing jobs. Eventually, he began to rise to fame as a writer, Hughes began referencing his past struggles regarding abuse from his father where he was divided between the trauma his father endured versus the damage it did to Hughes. Hughes's autobiography exemplifies the obstacles that many African-American artists faced during the early twentieth century in the United States.

Background 
Langston Hughes' childhood was tumultuous. He mainly grew up with his mother due to his father abandoning them in order to seek fortune in Mexico. Because of the color of her skin, Hughes' mother struggled at getting a well paying job which resulted in the family growing up in poverty. Through his mother's eyes, Hughes learned about the injustices in American society. He was sent to live with his grandmother for a period of time as his mother could not support him. He drew inspiration from his early life for his writings which led him to excel in school, and later saved his life.

When he was 17 years old, Hughes went to his father's estate in Mexico. Hughes was able to eventually enroll in college, but decided to drop out to work for different kinds of shipping vessels that sailed around the world. Like his mother, he faced the same difficulties finding a job that provided a stable income due to racism. Hughes later moved to Paris and found low income housing. There, he met many musicians from various music backgrounds. Paris at the time was going through a musical revolution with Jazz and Blues, and from that, Hughes gained interest in those genres and drew inspiration to his now well known poetic style. He ended up publishing two poetic books, but neither sold at a successful rate.

Hughes obtained a scholarship to study at Lincoln University, when he returned home to the United States. He was also able to establish a network of close friends. Hughes pointed out the irony of Lincoln having an all white faculty despite it being a black university, and advocated for employment of black faculty. In his senior year, he wrote his first book, Not Without Laughter (1930). He was able to garner financial support by an elderly white lady who advocated for black perspectives in literature. However, eventually Hughes learned that this lady was driven by prejudice and wanted to promote her own perspectives on black ideas. Ultimately, Hughes challenged her, which resulted in him getting cut off financially.

Hughes settled in Harlem at the time the financial boom was winding down in the 1920s. Hughes did whatever he could to become a writer. He also became a major voice in Harlem during the Harlem Renaissance. Hughes remembered this was one of the first moments he felt united with Black voices. The Big Sea closed on the moment when Hughes won the Hammond Award in 1931. Hughes described how the Hammond Award elevated his career as a writer, and how he hoped to inspire future Black writers.

Plot summary 
The Big Sea chronicles Hughes' late teens to twenties in the 1920s and early 1930s from the US across the Atlantic.

Life in the US and Mexico 
Documenting what life was like for Hughes moving all over the eastern and central US as well as living in Mexico with his father, Hughes chronicled the drama and the violence that he experienced and saw as a young black man in anti-black countries. Over a few year span he decided he needed to move back to the US which created conflict with his father. Back and forth conflicts over financial assistance led Langston Hughes to search for a way to make his own money. He started out as an English tutor and became very popular. Soon he had enough money to move back to the US to stay with his mother and other family members. He also started college but he quickly decided it wasn't for him. Needing and wanting to make money he turned to odd jobs, eventually landing himself at a shipyard.

Life abroad 
At the age of 21, Hughes boarded the ship S.S. Malone as a mess boy bound for West Africa. From 1922 to 1924 Hughes worked on the S.S. Malone, experiencing many west African countries before returning to the US in 1925 to live with his mother in Washington DC. Gaining experience abroad influenced how Hughes moved through the US as a young adult; however, he did not stay long. Upon his second voyage across the Atlantic he stopped off in France and made his way to Paris with little to nothing in his pockets. He described those early days in Paris as initially exciting but the reality of having no money quickly weighed on him and he was forced to find cramped accommodations, sharing a room. Luckily his roommate was a kind and gentle dancer and she eagerly looked for employment as did Langston. His descriptions of the difficulties finding employment as a Black American who was not a singer, musician or dancer at the height of the Jazz Age in Paris showed the anti-foreign sentiment of the local Frenchmen. It is in his descriptions of the people he met abroad that gave his audience some of the most rich personalities in Montmartre and Paris. He chronicled his travels around Europe in search of employment and travel opportunities as well as opportunities to publish his poetry. He made multiple trips back and forth across the Atlantic, meeting many important figures in the Harlem Renaissance as well as some of the most celebrated stars of Paris.

Reception 
Katherine Wood, a writer for The New York Times, talked about her experience reading The Big Sea. She mentioned how Langston Hughes's autobiography  "is the product and portrait of a very unusual spirit, in its narrative of crowded happenings and contrasts and the envisioning of a strange and significant time." Wood emphasized the idea of how the social circumstances of the time period and Hughes's situation really shaped his writing. Those characteristics were what really brought out the quality of the book in her opinion. The article was written on August 25, 1940.

An analysis of the book called it "one of the most insightful studies of the Harlem Renaissance ever written by one who had actually lived during that time," providing incredibly detailed accounts of the outside world and the spaces Hughes moved in as well as the people he found himself around, but he left much to be desired as to his internal states. His emotions were obscured behind the worlds he described and the people who filled it.

References

External links
 SuperSummary
A Negro Intellectual Tells His Life Story
Langston Hughes | Biography & Facts | Britannica
The big sea, an autobiography
The big sea: an autobiography
The Big Sea by Langston Hughes, from Project Gutenberg Canada
Summers, M. (2007, January 19). Langston Hughes (1902-1967). BlackPast.org. https://www.blackpast.org/african-american-history/hughes-langston-1902-1967/
Individual Authors. (1987). Journal of Modern Literature, 14(2/3), 287–409. http://www.jstor.org/stable/3831515
Langston Hughes, The Big Sea

1940 non-fiction books
African-American autobiographies
African-American diaspora in Paris